Zosterocarpus is a genus of brown algae.  The name means 'sori in belt.'

References

Brown algae genera
Chordariaceae
Taxa named by Jean-Baptiste Édouard Bornet